Victor Kutlwano Sekekete (born 28 January 1994) is a South African professional rugby union player for  in the Currie Cup and in the Rugby Challenge. His regular position is flanker, but he also played as a lock earlier in his career.

Rugby career

2012 : Schoolboy rugby

Sekekete was born in Johannesburg, where he attended Queens High School. In 2012, he was selected to represent the Golden Lions at the premier rugby union competition for high schools in South Africa, the Under-18 Craven Week. He started all three of their matches as a lock, as his team qualified to play in the unofficial final match of the tournament, where they lost to Gauteng rivals the Blue Bulls.

2013–2015 : Youth rugby

After school, Sekekete joined the Golden Lions academy. He featured in all fourteen of the  team's matches in the 2013 Under-19 Provincial Championship, starting thirteen of those and playing off the bench in the other. He scored three tries during the season – one against the s and one in each of their matches against the s.

He featured in all seven of their matches in a disappointing season that saw the team finish second-bottom of the log which meant they had to compete in a relegation play-off to retain their Varsity Cup status. Sekete started the play-off match in which UJ easily beat Varsity Shield runners-up  to remain in the top tier.

Sekekete was then included in the South Africa Under-20 squad that competed at the 2014 IRB Junior World Championship in New Zealand. He was not included in the squad for their opening match in Pool C, a 61–5 victory over Scotland, but played off the bench in their next match, a 33–24 victory over the hosts. He was named on the bench for their remaining three fixtures in the competition – a 21– win over Samoa to secure top spot in Pool C to qualify for the semi-finals, a 32–25 win over New Zealand in the semi-finals and a 20–21 loss to England in the final – but failed to get any game time in those matches.

Sekekete returned to domestic action by making twelve appearances for the  team in the 2014 Under-21 Provincial Championship. He scored two tries during the competition – both in a 113–3 victory over  – as the Golden Lions finished in third spot on the log before losing to the Blue Bulls in the semi-finals, the only match of the season that Sekekete did not feature in.

He again featured in every match for the  team in the 2015 Under-21 Provincial Championship. In his most prolific season so far in his career, he scored tries against the Sharks, Eastern Province and Leopards during the regular season, and another one in their 20–43 defeat to Western Province in the semi-finals of the competition.

2016–present : Golden Lions

Sekekete was included in the ' Currie Cup squad for the first time for the 2016 season.

References

South African rugby union players
Living people
1994 births
Rugby union players from Johannesburg
Rugby union locks
Rugby union flankers
Golden Lions players
South Africa Under-20 international rugby union players
Southern Kings players
Eastern Province Elephants players
Griquas (rugby union) players
Cheetahs (rugby union) players
Free State Cheetahs players